Balcombe tunnel is a railway tunnel on the Brighton Main Line through the Sussex Weald between Three Bridges and Balcombe. The track is electrified with a 750 V DC third-rail.

History

The tunnel was constructed by the London and Brighton Railway between 1838 and 1841, through Grinstead Clay, with five ventilation shafts. The engineer for the line was John Urpeth Rastrick; the contractor responsible for the brick-lined tunnel is not known.
Ingress of water from the ground above was experienced during the construction of the tunnel, and this has remained a problem throughout its history. Rastrick described the tunnelling as very treacherous, requiring great caution on the part of the miners working it, as "it swells and effloresces as soon as exposed to the air." Between 1907 and 1909 the tunnel was partially relined with engineering brick.

Galvanised iron sheets were fitted to prevent the water falling on passengers in open carriages, but the blast from the steam locomotives and air pressure created by the passage of trains could result in the metal sheets being torn from the structure, creating a serious hazard. Thereafter drivers were warned about the hazard presented by hanging icicles.

The "railway murderer" Percy Lefroy Mapleton left the body of his victim in Balcombe tunnel in 1881.

In July 1903 plans were finalised for the boring of a second Balcombe tunnel as part of the scheme to quadruple the Brighton Main Line throughout, but these were never implemented.

In 1998/9 catchment trays were fitted under the tunnel's ventilation shafts to divert seeping ground water from the shafts into the track drainage system, with a sixth added in 2006/7. The trays consisted of steel decking, gutters and flashings which were installed under limited track possessions. The tray supports had failed by 2013, requiring the installation of additional support brackets, and the Office of Rail Regulation enforced improvements in tunnel examination procedures.

Work is scheduled in October 2018 and February 2019 as part of a £300m improvement programme to stem the leaks, re-lay the track and replace the points.

Views
North portal - see http://www.safeguardeurope.com/case_studies/tunnel_waterproofing_balcombe.php
Aerial view - see http://wikimapia.org/7962596/Balcombe-Tunnel
Junction works timelapse video - see https://www.youtube.com/watch?v=hVsKl3fiquQ

References

Railway tunnels in England
Tunnels completed in 1841
London, Brighton and South Coast Railway
Rail transport in West Sussex
Tunnels in West Sussex
1841 establishments in England